The 2019 Giro d'Italia was a three-week Grand Tour cycling stage race organised by RCS Sport that took place mainly in Italy, between 11 May and 2 June 2019. The race was the 102nd edition of the Giro d'Italia and was the first Grand Tour of the 2019 cycling season. The race started with an individual time trial in Bologna, and finished with another time-trial in Verona. The race was won by Richard Carapaz, who became the first Ecuadorian rider to win the Giro d'Italia. Italian Vincenzo Nibali finished 2nd, with Slovenian rider Primož Roglič in 3rd place. Carapaz also became the second South American rider to win the Giro, after Nairo Quintana in 2014.			

Pascal Ackermann narrowly won the points classification before Arnaud Démare, with Damiano Cima in third place. Giulio Ciccone won mountains classification after leading it through 20 of the race's 21 stages, and Miguel Ángel López won the young rider classification.

Teams

All 18 UCI WorldTeams were automatically invited and were obliged to attend the race. Four wildcard UCI Professional Continental teams were also selected. Because of an agreement between RCS Sport and the organisers of the Coppa Italia di ciclismo (the Italian Road Cycling Cup) one of the four wildcards is traditionally reserved for the overall cup winner. All of the wildcard teams had previously participated in the Giro, and three out of the four teams participated in the previous year. The one exception was Nippo–Vini Fantini, whose last participation in the Giro was in 2016. Each team started with eight riders. The on-stage presentation of the teams took place in Bologna on 9 May, two days before the opening stage.

The teams entering the race were:

Pre-race favourites
Two previous Giro d'Italia champions, Vincenzo Nibali and Tom Dumoulin, are considered to be among the favorites for the Maglia Rosa, together with Miguel Ángel López, Mikel Landa, Primož Roglič and Simon Yates.

Other riders believed to be competitive in the general classification were Richard Carapaz, Esteban Chaves, Davide Formolo, Ion Izagirre, Bob Jungels, Rafał Majka, Bauke Mollema, Ben O'Connor and Ilnur Zakarin.

Riders believed to be the main contenders for victories on the sprint stages are the current German national champion Pascal Ackermann, Frenchman Arnaud Démare, Australian rider Caleb Ewan, Colombia's Fernando Gaviria, and the defending winner of the points classification, Italian Elia Viviani.

Route and stages

The race started on 11 May with an 8 km cronoscalata, a mountain time trial, in Bologna, which concluded with a  climb to the Sanctuary of the Madonna di San Luca. The steep (average gradient 9.7%) climb, which is regularly used as a finish in the Italian autumn classic Giro dell'Emilia, made its debut in the Giro in 1956 in a time trial stage won by Charly Gaul, and had now made its fourth appearance in the Giro. The race then headed south, with the second stage crossing the Apennines into Tuscany, honouring Tuscan cyclist Gino Bartali with a stage finish in Fucecchio. The following stage started in Vinci, celebrating the 500th anniversary of the death of Leonardo da Vinci, and finished in Orbetello, which also acted as the start location for the following stage, in which the race left Tuscany for the Lazio region with a stage finish in Frascati. Continuing south, the peloton then left Frascati for a stage finish in Terracina, and, following a short transfer to Cassino, crossed the country on a hilly stage to the Apulian region on eastern coast, finishing in the town of San Giovanni Rotondo. The race then headed north, with stage finishes in L'Aquila and Pesaro. Stage nine's individual time trial in San Marino was the last stage before the rest day, and the only occasion where the Giro left Italy.

Following the first rest day, the riders tackled two flat stages with finishes in Modena and Novi Ligure. It finished with a very short, but steep climb in the town of Pinerolo, with the gradient reaching 20%. The thirteenth stage has been considered to become the first big test for the riders aiming for the general classification and included the race's first summit finish, at Lago Serrù, close to Ceresole Reale. Two other categorized climbs were included in the stage, namely the Colle del Lys and the Pian del Lupo.

Following the second, and last, rest day on 27 May, the riders faced what has been dubbed as the queen stage of the race, which started in Lovere, included several categorized climbs, including the Passo del Mortirolo, before finishing in Ponte di Legno. Initially, the stage was meant to also feature the Passo di Gavia, previously featured in 2014, in a stage won by Nairo Quintana, who later won the overall classification, however the climb was ultimately removed from the route two days before the stage was run due to snow and poor weather conditions. The Mortirolo was first included in the race in 1990, and has since then made many appearances in the race, most recently on the 16th stage at the 2017 won by Vincenzo Nibali. The race finished with a  time trial in Verona.

Race overview

The first stage, an 8 km mountain time trial in Bologna, was won by Primož Roglič who therefore became the first wearer of the maglia rosa, the pink jersey identifying the leader of the general classification. Roglič also took the lead in the points classification. Giulio Ciccone took the lead in the mountains classification and became the first wearer of the blue jersey, while Miguel Ángel López finished as the fastest young rider and became the leader of the young rider classification. Stage 2, the first bunch sprint stage, was taken by Pascal Ackermann, who benefited from a mistake by Elia Viviani in the setup for the sprint. Roglič held the maglia rosa for another day, while Ackermann took the points classification. Ciccone also went into the breakaway and maintained his lead in the mountains classification. The third stage was once again a group sprint, but this one had much more controversy. In the leadup to the sprint, Viviani pulled out of line and bumped Matteo Moschetti out of the way. Viviani won the stage on the road, but judges later relegated him for an illegal sprint, which handed the win and points classification to Fernando Gaviria. No other changes in the jerseys occurred. Richard Carapaz won the fourth stage after a late attack. Multiple crashes with only a few kilometers left of the stage saw several riders go down. One of those affected was favorite Tom Dumoulin, who eventually finished the stage four minutes after many other favorites had crossed the line. Roglič extended his general classification lead out to 35 seconds, and Ackermann took back the points classification. Stage five was a drenched one, with a neutralized bunch sprint at the end. Ackermann took the win after nearly colliding with a  rider. Gaviria took a close second. Dumoulin officially withdrew after only a few kilometers of the stage, stating that the pain was too much to continue.

The first shakeup of the race occurred on stage six, where the breakaway took the stage. Fausto Masnada beat Valerio Conti to the line, beating the peloton by a full seven minutes. Conti was handed over the maglia rosa with the rest of the breakaway riders between him and Roglič because of this. Giovanni Carboni gained the young rider classification also. Stage seven was another day for the breakaway, this time Pello Bilbao fending off Tony Gallopin for the victory. Stage eight saw Caleb Ewan take the sprint over Elia Viviani and Pascal Ackermann, the holder of the maglia ciclamino at the time. Stage nine, the San Marino time trial that would round out the first week, saw Primož Roglič victorious again, this time only 11 seconds over Victor Campenaerts and a full minute over Bauke Mollema and the rest of the GC favorites. Conti still held the maglia rosa.

A slight controversy opened up the second week, with stage ten ending in a reduced sprint caused by the fall of the maglia ciclamino holder Ackermann. Arnaud Démare found victory over Viviani and Rüdiger Selig, who sprinted after Ackermann's crash. Ackermann would finish, although losing the ciclamino to Demare, and Matteo Moschetti would withdraw from injuries sustained in the incident. Ewan found victory once again in stage eleven, where he once again beat Demare and Ackermann. Ewan and Viviani both announced their withdrawals afterwards, in preparation for the Tour de France. Stage twelve followed the common roads of the Giro di Lombardia, where Cesare Benedetti of the breakaway took his first pro win over Damiano Caruso and Eddie Dunbar. It also saw Jan Polanc taking over the general classification from his teammate Conti. The thirteenth stage was the first true mountain stage of the Giro, and was potentially the turning point. Ilnur Zakarin took victory after an attack, in which he caught up and surpassed second placed Mikel Nieve, with Mikel Landa coming in third. The surprise of the day was Richard Carapaz, who essentially was let go by Vincenzo Nibali and Roglič. This placed him right with the other favorites, two down on Roglič and a further two on Polanc. However, on the other end of the spectrum, big names like Miguel Ángel López and Simon Yates lose multiple minutes on the day. Stage fourteen was arguably the maglia rosa-deciding stage, as Carapaz was once again on the attack for minutes. The rest of the favorites once again let him go, and let his gap grow to nearly two minutes for a decisive victory. Yates placed in second, gaining about 20 seconds on the rest of the favorites. The fifteenth day of racing was one for the break again, as Dario Cataldo edged out Mattia Cattaneo for the win, with Yates once again placing on the podium. This stage saw Roglic lose a bit of time on his rivals after a nightmare day filled with crashes and such, obtaining a needed break from the final rest day.

The third week began with the now-shortened "queen stage" of the race. Missing out on the Gavia Pass, the challenging day saw the maglia azzurra (mountain classification) leader Giulio Ciccone not only secure the classification, but win the stage from a tough breakaway with Jan Hirt in a close second. Fausto Masnada grabbed his second podium of the race in third, and saw Lopez lose some 20 seconds on Nibali, as well as Roglič over a minute. The seventeenth day was another one for the break, this time Nans Peters breaking through for the win, with Esteban Chaves around a minute and a half back, and Davide Formolo rounded out in third. Nibali, Roglič, and others once again lost seconds on Carapaz. Stage eighteen, however, was more or less a break in the action for many. Damiano Cima outlasted the sprint trains to take a surprise win over Ackermann and Simone Consonni. Demare held the points classification up to this point, but bad positioning meant he brought it home in eighth, putting Ackermann in the maglia ciclamino to the end of the race. Stage nineteen was yet another for the break, this time Chaves finally nabbing a stage win for himself and Mitchelton–Scott. Andrea Vendrame and Amaro Antunes made up the top three, with Lopez gaining around 45 seconds on his rivals. The penultimate stage of the Giro was maybe one of the more exciting ones, with Pello Bilbao taking another one for himself over Landa, with Ciccone not far behind in third. Roglič and Yates both lost 50 seconds to the favorites, and Lopez once again lost 2 minutes on them. That left everything on the table for the final time trial to round out this year's edition. The American Chad Haga surprisingly gave Sunweb their one and only win in the Giro, with Campernaerts once again only four seconds down, and with Thomas De Gendt taking the final place on the podium, rounding out an excellent Giro.

Carapaz became the first Ecuadorian rider to win a Grand Tour and the second South American rider to win the Giro, after Colombian Nairo Quintana in 2014. Vincenzo Nibali placed second, one minute down, and Roglič managed to take third back from Landa on the final day by eight seconds. Pascal Ackermann took the points classification by 13 points over Arnaud Démare, and Giulio Ciccone outright dominated the mountain classification. Miguel Ángel López unsurprisingly took the youth classification over Pavel Sivakov, and Movistar unsurprisingly took the team classification.

Incidents
About  from the finish of stage 18, a spectator walked onto the road shortly before the escape group reached the spot and dropped a bicycle in the path of the riders. The man then walked away from the scene. Another spectator stepped in and removed the obstacle. On 4 June 2019, it was reported that the identified perpetrator, a man from Tunisia, faced expulsion back to his home country due to his actions.

During the final ascent to Croce d'Aune on stage 20, Miguel Ángel López was knocked off his bike in an incident with a spectator. Before he got back on his bike, López hit the fan several times in anger. He would go on to lose almost two minutes on the group of other favourites at the end of the stage. Even though UCI regulations stipulate that a rider who engages in physical violence is to be disqualified from the event, López was given no punishment for his action. The UCI announced on 2 June 2019 that they had launched an investigation into the jury's decision not to apply a penalty.

Doping
On 15 May 2019, the UCI announced that they had provisionally suspended Kristijan Koren, part of his squad for the 2019 Giro, for his alleged involvement in the Operation Aderlass doping case. The team subsequently pulled Koren out of the race.

Classification leadership

In the Giro d'Italia, four different jerseys are awarded. The first and most important is the general classification, calculated by adding each rider's finishing times on each stage. Riders receive time bonuses (10, 6 and 4 seconds respectively) for finishing in the first three places on each stage. Smaller time bonuses are also given to the top three riders at the last intermediate sprint on each stage (3, 2 and 1 seconds respectively). The rider with the lowest cumulative time is awarded the pink jersey, and is considered the winner of the Giro d'Italia.

Additionally, there is a points classification. Riders win points for finishing in the top placings on each stage or by being within the first cyclists to reach intermediate sprint locations along each mass-start stage. Flat stages award more points than mountainous stages, meaning that this classification tends to favour sprinters. The leader of the points classification wore the cyclamen jersey.

There is also a mountains classification, for which points were awarded for reaching the top of a climb before other riders. Each climb was categorised as either first, second, third or fourth-category, with more points available for the more difficult, higher-categorised climbs. For first-category climbs, the top eight riders earned points; on second-category climbs, six riders won points; on third-category climbs, only the top four riders earned points with three on fourth-category climbs. The leadership of the mountains classification was marked by a blue jersey. The Cima Coppi, the race's highest point of elevation, awards more points than the other first-category climbs, with nine riders scoring points. Initially, the Cima Coppi was scheduled to be the Passo di Gavia on the sixteenth stage, but due to weather the climb was removed from the itinerary. The next highest climb was that to Serrù Lake, however the climb had already been ascended prior to the cancellation. As a result, organisers chose to assign the Cima Coppi to the highest climb out of those which had not been ascended – the Passo Manghen on stage 20.

The fourth jersey represents the young rider classification. This is decided the same way as the general classification, but only riders born after 1 January 1994 are eligible. The winner of the classification is awarded a white jersey. There are also two classifications for teams. In the Trofeo Fast Team classification, the times of the best three cyclists per team on each stage are added up; the leading team is one with the lowest total time. The Trofeo Super Team is a team points classification, with the top 20 riders of each stage earning points for their team.

The first additional award is the intermediate sprint classification. Each road stage has two sprints – the Traguardi Volanti. The first 5 riders across the intermediate sprint lines are awarded points (10, 6, 3, 2 and 1 points respectively); the rider with the most points at the end of the race wins the classification. Another classification – the combativity prize – involves points awarded to the first riders at the stage finishes, at intermediate sprints, and at the summits of categorised climbs. There is also a breakaway award. For this, points are awarded to each rider in any breakaway smaller than 10 riders that escapes for at least . Each rider is awarded a point for each kilometre that the rider was away from the peloton. The rider with the most points at the end of the Giro wins the award. The final classification is a "fair play" ranking for each team. Teams are given penalty points for infringing various rules. These range from half-point penalties, for offences that merit warnings from race officials, to a 2000-point penalty, for a positive doping test. The team that has the lowest points total at the end of the Giro wins the classification. When several teams are tied on points, the team with the highest classified rider in the general classification will be the higher ranked team in the fair play classification.

Final standings

General classification

Points classification

Mountains classification

Young rider classification

General Super Team

Intermediate sprint classification

Combativity classification

Breakaway classification

References

Bibliography

External links

Official site

 
2019
2019 UCI World Tour
2019 in Italian sport
May 2019 sports events in Italy
June 2019 sports events in Italy